Montalbán or Montalban is a surname of Hispanic origin. Persons bearing the name include:

 Carlos Montalbán (1903–1991), Mexican character actor, brother of Ricardo
 Isabel Pérez Montalbán (born 1964), Spanish poet
 Juan Pérez de Montalbán (1602–1638), Spanish priest, poet, and novelist
 Juvenal Edjogo-Owono Montalbán (born 1979), Equatoguinean professional footballer
 Madeline Montalban (1910–1982), English ceremonial magician
 Manuel Vázquez Montalbán (1939–2003), Spanish journalist, novelist, and humorist
 Óscar Montalbán Ramos (a.k.a. Rubio) (born 1976), Spanish professional footballer
 Paolo Montalbán (born 1973), Filipino-American actor and singer
 Ricardo Montalbán (1920–2009), Mexican film and stage actor

Fictional character

 Soraya Montenegro de la Vega Montalban, character in the Mexican television series María la del Barrio

See also 

 Montalbano (disambiguation)